Lago di Pontesei is a lake in the Province of Belluno, Veneto, Italy.

The dam originally formed a much larger area, which reached the confluence with the Maresón torrent in the Pónt of Péez.

Pontesei Landslide 

The accident is considered to have foreshadowed the  thanks to the similar way it unfolded, and, while the Vajont Dam was built in neighbouring Longarone, it was observed with great concern.

Condition of the basin after the landslide 
The rock collapsed, still clearly visible from the road, partially filled the basin (which until 1966 continued to be filled up to its maximum depth), forming a sort of promontory within the lake. ENEL significantly reduced its average load level for safety reasons, on the order of civil engineering after the 1966 flood.

References

Lakes of Veneto
Artificial lakes of Italy
Dam failures in Europe